Rui Nuno Paulo Monteiro (born 6 January 1991) is a Portuguese professional footballer who plays as a midfielder.

Club career
Monteiro was born in Sintra, Lisbon District. He spent all but his senior career in Portugal in the third division, where he represented Casa Pia AC, S.U. Sintrense and S.C.U. Torreense.

The exception to this was in the 2012–13 season, when Monteiro played five matches for C.S. Marítimo's reserve team in the Segunda Liga. He made his debut in the competition on 22 August 2012, playing the entire 1–0 away loss against U.D. Oliveirense.

In the 2018 January transfer window, Monteiro signed with French Championnat National 2 club US Lusitanos Saint-Maur.

References

External links

1991 births
Living people
People from Sintra
Portuguese footballers
Association football midfielders
Liga Portugal 2 players
Segunda Divisão players
Casa Pia A.C. players
C.S. Marítimo players
S.U. Sintrense players
S.C.U. Torreense players
Championnat National 2 players
US Lusitanos Saint-Maur players
Portuguese expatriate footballers
Expatriate footballers in France
Portuguese expatriate sportspeople in France
Sportspeople from Lisbon District